Weston Fen can refer to 

Weston Fen, Oxfordshire
Weston Fen, Suffolk